This is a select bibliography of post-World War II English-language books (including translations) and journal articles about the Early Slavs and Rus' and its borderlands until the Mongol invasions beginning in 1223. Book entries may have references to reviews published in academic journals or major newspapers when these could be considered helpful.

A brief selection of English translations of primary sources is included. The sections "General Surveys" and "Biographies" contain books; other sections contain both books and journal articles. Book entries have references to journal articles and reviews about them when helpful. Additional bibliographies can be found in many of the book-length works listed below; see Further Reading for several book and chapter-length bibliographies. The External Links section contains entries for publicly available select bibliographies from universities.

Inclusion criteria
Works included are referenced in the notes or bibliographies of scholarly secondary sources or journals. Included works should either be published by an academic or widely distributed publisher, be authored by a notable subject matter expert as shown by scholarly reviews and have significant scholarly journal reviews about the work. To keep the bibliography length manageable, only items that clearly meet the criteria should be included.

Citation style
This bibliography uses APA style citations. Entries do not use templates. References to reviews and notes for entries do use citation templates. Where books which are only partially related to Russian history are listed, the titles for chapters or sections should be indicated if possible, meaningful, and not excessive.

If a work has been translated into English, the translator should be included and a footnote with appropriate bibliographic information for the original language version should be included.

When listing works with titles or names published with alternative English spellings, the form used in the latest published version should be used and the version and relevant bibliographic information noted if it previously was published or reviewed under a different title.

General works

Period works (7501223)

 Alef, G. (1983). Rulers and Nobles in 15th-Century Muscovy. London, UK: Variorum.
 Birnbaum, H., Flier, M. S., & Rowland, D. B. (1984). Medieval Russian Culture. Berkeley, CA: University of California Press.
 Black, J. (Ed.). (1999). The Development of Russian Military Power, 1453–1815. In European Warfare, 1453–1815. New York: Macmillan.
 Lohr, E. & Poe, M. (Eds.). (2002). The Military and Society in Russia 1450-1917: 1450-1917. Leiden: Brill.
 Martin, J. (2007). Medieval Russia, 980–1584. Cambridge University Press.
 Meyendorff, J. (1997). Byzantium and the Rise of Russia: A Study of Byzantino-Russian Relations in the Fourteenth Century. St Vladimirs Seminary Press.
 Nicolle, D., & PhD, D. N. (1999). Armies of Medieval Russia, 750-1250 (Illustrated edition). Osprey Publishing.
 Ostrowski, D., & Poe, M. T. (Eds.). (2011). Portraits of Old Russia: Imagined Lives of Ordinary People, 1300-1745. London, UK: Routledge.
 Paszkiewicz. H. (1954). The Origin of Russia. Chicago: The University of Chicago Press.
 Presniakov, A. E. (1970). The Formation of the Great Russian State. A Study of Russian History in the Thirteenth to Fifteenth Centuries. (A. E. Moorhouse, Trans.) Chicago: Quadrangle Books.

Early Slavs

 Barford, P. M. (2001). The Early Slavs: Culture and Society in Early Medieval Eastern Europe (1st edition). New York, NY: Cornell University Press.
 Bocek, V., Jansens, N., & Klir, T. (Eds.). (2020). New Perspectives on the Early Slavs and the Rise of Slavic: Contact and Migrations. Heidelberg: Universitatsverlag Winter.
 Bogatyrev, S. (2000). The Sovereign and his Counsellors: Ritualised Consultations in Muscovite Political Culture, 1350s-1570s. The Finnish Academy Sciences and Letters.
 Curta, F. (2001). The Making of the Slavs: History and Archaeology of the Lower Danube Region, c. 500–700. Cambridge, UK: Cambridge University Press.
 Curta, F. (2006). Southeastern Europe in the Middle Ages, 500–1250. Cambridge, UK: Cambridge University Press.
 Dolukhanov, P. (1996). The Early Slavs: Eastern Europe from the Initial Settlement to the Kievan Rus. London, UK: Routledge.
 Dvornik, F. (1956). The Slavs: Their Early History and Civilization. Boston, MA: American Academy of Arts and Sciences.
 Garipzanov, I. H. (Ed.). (2008). Franks, Northmen, and Slavs: Identities and State Formation in Early Medieval Europe. Turnhout: Brepols.
 Geary, P. (2001). Myth of Nations. The Medieval Origins of Europe. Princeton, NJ: Princeton University Press.
 Gimbutas, M. A. (1971). The Slavs. London, UK: Thames & Hudson.
 Halperin, C. (2010). National Identity in Premodern Rus'. Russian History, 37(3), 275–294.
 Magocsi, P. R. (2015). With Their Backs to the Mountains: A History of Carpathian Rus’ and Carpatho-Rusyns. Budapest: Central European University Press.
 Noonan, T. F. (1998). The Islamic World, Russia and the Vikings, 750-900. Farnham, UK: Ashgate Publishing.
 Plokhy, S. (2010). The Origins of the Slavic Nations: Premodern Identities in Russia, Ukraine, and Belarus. Cambridge, UK: Cambridge University Press.
 Pritsak, Omeljan (1977). The Origin of Rus'. The Russian Review, 36(3), 249–273.
 Pritsak, O. (1991). The Origin of Rus. Cambridge MA: Harvard University Press.

Kievan Rus'

 Dimnik, M. (1981). Mikhail, Prince of Chernigov and GrandPrince of Kiev, 1224–1246. Pontifical Institute of Mediaeval Studies.
 Dimnik, M. (1987). The "Testament" of Iaroslav "The Wise": A Re-examination. Canadian Slavonic Papers / Revue Canadienne Des Slavistes, 29(4), 369–386.
 Dimnik, M. (1994). The Dynasty of Chernigov 1054-1146. Pontifical Institute of Mediaeval Studies.
 Dimnik, M. (1996). Succession and inheritance in Rus’ before 1054. Pontifical Institute of Mediaeval Studies.
 Dimnik, M. (2003). The Dynasty of Chernigov, 1146–1246 (2nd edition). Cambridge, UK: Cambridge University Press.
 Franklin, S. (2001). Pre-Mongol Rus': New Sources, New Perspectives? The Russian Review, 60(4), 465–473.
 Franklin, S. (2006). Kievan Rus’ (1015–1125). In M. Perrie (Ed.), The Cambridge History of Russia (The Cambridge History of Russia, Vol.1, pp. 73–97). Cambridge: Cambridge University Press.
 Franklin, S., & Shepard, J. (1996). The Emergence of Rus: 750-1200. London, UK: Routledge.
 Hraundal, T. (2014). New Perspectives on Eastern Vikings/Rus in Arabic Sources. Viking and Medieval Scandinavia, 10, 65–98.
 Korpela, J. (2001). Prince, Saint and Apostle: Prince Vladimir Svjatoslavic of Kiev, His Posthumous Life, and the Religious Legitimization of the Russian Great Power. Otto Harrassowitz.
 Kovalev, R. (2015). Reimagining Kievan Rus' in Unimagined Europe. Russian History, 42(2), 158–187.
 Maiorov, A. (2015). The Alliance between Byzantium and Rus' Before the Conquest of Constantinople by the Crusaders in 1204. Russian History, 42(3), 272–303.
 Miller, D. (1992). The Many Frontiers of Pre-Mongol Rus'. Russian History, 19(1/4), 231–260.
 Pelenski, J. (1977). The Origins of the Official Muscovite Claims to the "Kievan Inheritance". Harvard Ukrainian Studies, 1(1), 29–52.
 Pelenski, J. (1987). The Sack of Kiev of 1169: Its Significance for the Succession to Kievan Rus'. Harvard Ukrainian Studies, 11(3/4), 303–316.
 Pelenski, J. (1988). The Contest for the "Kievan Succession" (1155-1175): The Religious-Ecclesiastical Dimension. Harvard Ukrainian Studies, 12/13, 761–780.
 Pelenski, J. (1998). The Contest for the Legacy of Kievan Rus'. New York, NY: East European Monographs, Columbia University Press.
 Raffensperger, C. (2012). Reimagining Europe: Kievan Rus’ in the Medieval World. Cambridge, MA: Harvard University Press.
 Raffensperger, C. (2016). Ties of Kinship: Genealogy and Dynastic Marriage in Kyivan Rus´ (Harvard Series In Ukrainian Studies). Cambridge: Harvard Ukrainian Research Institute.
 Stefanovich, P. (2016). The Political Organization of Rus' in the 10th Century. Jahrbücher Für Geschichte Osteuropas, 64(4), neue folge, 529–544.
 Vernadsky, G. (1973). Kievan Russia (A History of Russia, Vol.2). New Haven, CT: Yale University Press.

Religion and beliefs
 Bremer, T. (2013). Cross and Kremlin: A Brief History of the Orthodox Church in Russia (E. W. Gritsch, Trans.; Translation edition). Grand Rapids, MI: Eerdmans.
 Challis, N., & Dewey, H. (1987). Basil The Blessed, Holy Fool Of Moscow. Russian History, 14(1/4), 47–59.
 Clucas, L. (Ed.). (1988). The Byzantine Legacy in Eastern Europe Boulder, CO: East European Monographs.
 Fennell, J. L. (2015). A History of the Russian Church to 1488. London: Routledge.
 Franklin, S. (2002). Byzantium-Rus-Russia: Studies in the translation of Christian culture. Ashgate/Variorum.
 Kivelson, V. A., & Worobec, C. D. (Eds.). (2020). Witchcraft in Russia and Ukraine, 1000–1900: A Sourcebook (NIU Series in Slavic, East European, and Eurasian Studies). DeKalb: Northern Illinois University Press.
 Kulik, A. (2023). Jews in Old Rus´: A Documentary History (Harvard Series In Ukrainian Studies). Cambridge: Harvard Ukrainian Research Institute.
 Shepard, J. (2017). The Expansion of Orthodox Europe: Byzantium, the Balkans and Russia. London, UK: Routledge.
 Shubin, D. H. (2005). A History of Russian Christianity (4 vols.). New York: Agathon Press.

Other topics
 Birnbaum, H. (1981). Lord Novgorod the Great: Essays in the history and culture of a medieval city-state. Bloomington, IN: Slavica Publishers/Indian University.
 Hartley, J. M. (2021). The Volga: A History. New Haven: Yale University Press.
 Koloda, V., & Gorbanenko, S. (2020). Agriculture in the Forest-Steppe Region of Khazaria (East Central and Eastern Europe in the Middle Ages, 450–1450, Vol. 60). Leiden: Brill.
 Pritsak, O. (1998). The Origins of the Old Rus’ Weights and Monetary Systems: Two Studies in Western Eurasian Metrology and Numismatics in the Seventh to Eleventh Centuries (Harvard Series In Ukrainian Studies). Cambridge: Harvard Ukrainian Research Institute.

Biographies

Historiography
 Confino, M. (2009). The New Russian Historiography, and the Old—Some Considerations. History and Memory, 21(2), 7-33.
 Karpovich, M. (1943). Klyuchevski and Recent Trends in Russian Historiography. Slavonic and East European Review. American Series, 2(1), 31–39.
 Mazour, A. (1937). Modern Russian Historiography. The Journal of Modern History, 9(2), 169–202.
 Miller, D. (1986). The Kievan Principality in the Century before the Mongol Invasion: An Inquiry into Recent Research and Interpretation. Harvard Ukrainian Studies, 10(1/2), 215–240.
 Pelenski, J. (1998). The Contest for the Legacy of Kievan Rus’. New York, NY: East European Monographs, Columbia University.
 Vernadsky, G., & Pushkarev, S. G. (1978). Russian Historiography: A History. Belmont, MA: Nordland Publishing.

Primary Sources
A limited number of English language translated primary sources referred to in the above works.
 Cross, S. H. (2012). The Russian Primary Chronicle: Laurentian Text (O. P. Sherbowitz-Wetzor, Ed.). Cambridge, MA: Medieval Academy of America.
 Kaiser, D. H., & Marker, G. (1994). Reinterpreting Russian History: Readings, 860-1860s (First Edition). Oxford, UK: Oxford University Press.
 Zenkovsky, S. A. (Ed.). (1963). Medieval Russia's epics, chronicles, and tales (First edition). New York, NY: E. P. Dutton.

Reference works

Academic journals

Further reading
Many of the above works contain bibliographies. Included below are a selection of works with large bibliographies related to Russian history.
 Langer, L. N. (2001). Bibliography. In Historical Dictionary of Medieval Russia. Lanham, MD: The Scarecrow Press.
 Perrie, M. (2006). Bibliography. (2006). In M. Perrie (Ed.), The Cambridge History of Russia (The Cambridge History of Russia, Vol. 1, pp. 663–721). Cambridge: Cambridge University Press.

See also
 Bibliography of Russian history (1223–1613)
 Bibliography of Russian history (1613–1917)
 Bibliography of Ukrainian history
 Bibliography of the history of Belarus and Byelorussia

References

Notes

Citations

External links
 Everyday life and microhistory in Russia: A selected bibliography of critical studies. Indiana University, Bloomington.
 Janet Martin—Bibliography. (2015). Russian History, 42(1), 3–8.

 

Bibliography
Bibliography
Bibliography
Early
Russia
Russia